Renouf Atoni (né To'omaga; born 25 June 1995)  is a New Zealand rugby league footballer who plays as a  for Wakefield Trinity in the Betfred Super League.

He previously played for the Canterbury-Bankstown Bulldogs in the NRL.

Background
Atoni was born in Porirua, New Zealand. He is of Samoan (through Mother) and Tokelauan (through Father) descent.

His junior club was the Porirua Vikings.

Playing career

2018
Atoni made his NRL debut in Round 10 2018 against the Parramatta Eels.

On 23 September 2018, Atoni was part of the Canterbury side which defeated Newtown 18-12 in the 2018 Intrust Super Premiership NSW grand final.  The following week, To'omaga was part of the Canterbury side which defeated Queensland Cup winners Redcliffe 42-18 in the NRL State Championship final.

2019
On 6 May 2019, Atoni was named in the Canterbury Cup NSW residents team to play against the Queensland residents side.

2020
In round 2 of the 2020 NRL season, he scored his first try in the NRL as Canterbury-Bankstown were defeated by North Queensland 24-16 in front of an empty ANZ Stadium.

He made a total of 16 appearances for Canterbury in the 2020 NRL season.  The club finished in 15th place on the table, only avoiding the Wooden Spoon by for and against.

2021
In July 2021, Atoni signed a contract to join the Sydney Roosters starting in 2022.

2022
Atoni made no appearances for the Sydney Roosters during the 2022 NRL season. Atoni instead featured for the clubs NSW Cup team North Sydney playing a total of 14 matches.
On 30 November, Atoni signed a one-year deal with English side Wakefield Trinity.

References

External links
Bulldogs profile
From To'omaga to Atoni: The story behind Renouf's name change

1995 births
Living people
Canterbury-Bankstown Bulldogs players
New Zealand sportspeople of Samoan descent
New Zealand people of Tokelauan descent
New Zealand rugby league players
Rugby league players from Porirua
Rugby league props
Wakefield Trinity players